Eric Olivier (24 November 1888 – 1 June 1925) was a South African first-class cricketer who played in England prior to the First World War. He was a right-handed batsman who bowled right-arm fast-medium. During the war he served in the British Army's Royal Flying Corps and became a flying ace credited with eight victories.

Background and education
Olivier was born in Oudtshoorn, then in the British South African Cape Colony, and was educated at Repton School, Derbyshire and Cambridge University.

Sporting career
Olivier represented Repton in matches against Uppingham and Malvern in 1906, before making his first-class début for Cambridge University in 1908 against Yorkshire. From 1908 to 1909 Olivier represented the university in fifteen first-class matches. With his fast-medium bowling Olivier took 83 wickets at an average of 20.20, with best bowling figures of 8-51 coming in 1908 against a G.J.V. Weigall's XI. Olivier's final first-class match for the university came against Oxford University in July 1909. During his time playing for the university, Olivier was their best strike bowler.

During his time at Cambridge Olivier also played association football for Cambridge University A.F.C.

Olivier joined Hampshire for the 1911 County Championship, making his début against Leicestershire. Olivier represented the county in seven first-class matches during the 1911 season, the last of which came against Sussex at the United Services Recreation Ground in Portsmouth. Olivier's time with the club was not as successful as his spell with Cambridge University. In his seven first-class matches he took 7 wickets at an average of 51.28, with best figures of 4-30.

Upon returning to South Africa Olivier represented South Western Districts in two non-first-class matches in 1913 against the Marylebone Cricket Club.

Military service

In the First World War Olivier first served as a trooper in the Union Defence Force during the South-West Africa Campaign.

On 17 March 1917 he was commissioned as a temporary second lieutenant (on probation) on the General List to serve in the British Army's Royal Flying Corps. He was appointed a flying officer on 8 May, and was confirmed in his rank on 16 July. Olivier was posted to No. 19 Squadron to fly the SPAD S.VII single seater fighter aircraft. He gained his first aerial victory on 26 October 1917 by driving down out of control a German Type C reconnaissance aircraft south-west of Geluwe, and on 31 October he drove down an Albatros D.V over Geluwe. On 15 November he and Major Albert D. Carter shared in the destruction of another Type C over Zandvoorde. Three days later, on 18 November, Olivier, Carter and Lieutenant A. Reid-Walker, drove down a Type C over Passchendaele. He gained his fifth victory, and "ace" status, on 6 December, when he, Captain Oliver Bryson and Lieutenants Arthur Fairclough and R. G. Holt, drove down another Type C east of Roeselare. His last victory in the SPAD came on 22 December, by sharing in the shooting down in flames of an Albatros D.V south of Le Quesnoy with Major Carter, Captains Bryson and G. W. Taylor, Lieutenant Fairclough, and Second Lieutenants E. J. Blyth and H. E. Galer. By January 1918 No. 19 Squadron had been re-equipped with the Sopwith Dolphin. On 17 March, flying this new aircraft, Olivier and Fairclough shot down in flames an Albatros D.V north-east of Menen, and shortly after Olivier accounted for a Pfalz D.III over Roeselare. Lieutenant Olivier was transferred to the RAF's unemployed list on 28 December 1918.

Post-war career
After the war Olivier represented South Western Districts for a final time in 1922 against the touring Marylebone Cricket Club.

Olivier died in Cape Town, South Africa, on 1 June 1925.

References

External links
Eric Olivier at Cricinfo
Eric Olivier at CricketArchive
Matches and detailed statistics for Eric Olivier

1888 births
1925 deaths
People educated at Repton School
Alumni of the University of Cambridge
South African cricketers
South African soccer players
Cambridge University A.F.C. players
Cambridge University cricketers
Hampshire cricketers
South Western Districts cricketers
British Army personnel of World War I
Royal Flying Corps officers
Royal Air Force officers
British World War I flying aces
Royal Air Force personnel of World War I
Association footballers not categorized by position
South African Army personnel
South African military personnel of World War I
People from Oudtshoorn
Cricketers from the Western Cape
Expatriates from Cape Colony in the United Kingdom